Kathryn Salfelder (born 1987 in Paterson, New Jersey) is a contemporary American composer, conductor and pianist, based in the Boston area. She has received commissions from the Albany Symphony, Boston Musica Viva, United States Air Force Band – Washington D.C., American Bandmasters Association, New York Virtuoso Singers, and Japan Wind Ensemble Conductors Conference (JWECC).

Awards include an ASCAP Morton Gould Young Composer Award, ASCAP/CBDNA Frederick Fennell Prize, Ithaca College Walter Beeler Memorial Composition Prize, and the USAF Colonel Arnald D. Gabriel Award. Her music has been performed by the Minnesota Orchestra, New England Philharmonic, Yale Philharmonia, and the Dallas Wind Symphony, and featured in over two hundred concerts at the nation’s leading universities and conservatories.

Salfelder was a Lecturer at MIT, and currently teaches composition and music history at the New England Conservatory

DMA, New England Conservatory. MM, Yale School of Music. BM, New England Conservatory. Studies with Michael Gandolfi, Aaron Jay Kernis, and David Lang.

Compositions

Works for wind ensemble
 2007 Cathedrals
 2008 Laudate Dominum in Tympanis (an arrangement of a piece by Giovanni Pierluigi da Palestrina for 6 trumpets and 6 trombones)
 2009 Crossing Parallels
 2012 Ungrounded Base
 2012 Stylus Phantasticus
 2015 Shadows Ablaze (quoting Ockeghem's D'un autre amer)
 2016 Prospect Hill (for brass ensemble)

Works for orchestra
 2008 Dessin No. 1
 2011 Lux Perpetua, for solo Soprano Saxophone and Orchestra

Solo and chamber music
 2005 Two Etudes, for solo piano
 2006 Three Fanfares, for brass quintet
 2006 Permutations and iterations, for percussion duo
 2008 Soliloquy, for solo flute
 2009 Six Miniatures, for solo trumpet and wind quintet
 2013 whispering into the night, for solo guitar
 2013 Fanfare and Fugue, for trombone quartet
 2013 Gold's Fool: A Tale of King Midas and the Golden Touch, for children's chorus, narrator, and chamber ensemble
 2015 Stolen from Above, for saxophone quartet
 2016 Disciples, for fl, cl, vln, vc, perc & pno

Awards
 2012 ASCAP Morton Gould Young Composer Award
 2012 Tourjee Alumni Scholarship
 2009 US Air Force Colonel Arnald D. Gabriel Award
 2009 New England Conservatory Donald Martino Award for Excellence in Composition
 2009 New England Conservatory George Chadwick Medal
 2008 ASCAP/CBDNA Frederick Fennell Prize
 2008 Ithaca College Walter Beeler Memorial Composition Prize
 Fifth Annual Andrew De Grado Piano Competition - Winner
 Japanese Society of Boston Toru Takemitsu Award

References

External links
 Official website

1987 births
21st-century American composers
21st-century classical composers
American women classical pianists
American classical pianists
American women classical composers
American classical composers
American marimbists
Living people
Musicians from Paterson, New Jersey
21st-century classical pianists
21st-century American women pianists
21st-century American pianists
Classical musicians from New Jersey
21st-century women composers